MBIM may refer to:

 Majlis Bahasa Indonesia-Malaysia, former name of the regional language organization Majlis Bahasa Brunei-Indonesia-Malaysia
 Member of the British Institute of Management, now the Chartered Management Institute
 Mobile Broadband Interface Model, a computer protocol; See Lanedo